Shantha may refer to

Shantha Abeysekara, Sri Lankan politician
Shantha Bandara, Sri Lankan politician
Shantha Biotechnics, Indian biotechnology company 
Shantha Dange, Sri Lankan cricketer.
Shantha Francis, Anglican Bishop of Kurunegala, Sri Lanka
Shantha Roberts, TV presenter
K. G. Shantha, Sri Lanka navy officer
Waruna Shantha, Sri Lankan cricketer
Shantha Sinha, Anti-child labour activist
K. W. Shantha Bandara, Sri Lankan politician
Shantha Kalavitigoda, Sri Lankan cricketer 
Shantha Kottegoda, Sri Lankan cricketer
J. Shantha, Indian politician
Shantha Rangaswamy, Indian cricketer
Shantha Sakkubai, 1939 Tamil film

Sinhalese masculine given names
Sinhalese surnames
Tamil feminine given names